South Korea has the raw materials and equipment to produce a nuclear weapon but has not opted to make one. In August 2004, South Korea revealed the extent of its highly secretive and sensitive nuclear research programs to the International Atomic Energy Agency (IAEA), including some experiments which were conducted without the obligatory reporting to the IAEA called for by South Korea's safeguards agreement. The failure to report was reported by the IAEA Secretariat to the IAEA Board of Governors; however, the IAEA Board of Governors decided to not make a formal finding of noncompliance. However, South Korea has continued on a stated policy of non-proliferation of nuclear weapons and has adopted a policy to maintain a nuclear-free Korean Peninsula.

By contrast, North Korea has and is developing additional nuclear weapons.

Early nuclear ambitions 
When the United States notified the South Korean administration of its plan to withdraw USFK in July 1970, South Korea first considered the possibility of an independent nuclear program. Under the direction of South Korea's Weapons Exploitation Committee, the country attempted to obtain plutonium reprocessing facilities following the pullout of the 26,000 American soldiers of the 7th Infantry Division in 1971. After South Vietnam had fallen in April 1975, then South Korean president Park Chung-hee first mentioned its nuclear weapons aspiration during the press conference on 12 June 1975. However, under pressure from the United States, France eventually decided not to deliver a reprocessing facility to South Korea in 1975. South Korea's nuclear weapons research program effectively ended on April 23, 1975, with its ratification of the Nuclear Non-Proliferation Treaty.

Post-NPT programs 
The South Korean government insists that its nuclear program is for peaceful purposes only.

Previously unreported experiments
In 1982, scientists at the Korean Atomic Energy Research Institute performed an experiment in which they extracted several milligrams of plutonium. Although plutonium has uses other than the manufacture of weapons, the United States later insisted that South Korea not attempt to reprocess plutonium in any way. In exchange, the US agreed to transfer reactor technology and give financial assistance to South Korea's nuclear energy program. It was revealed in 2004 that some South Korean scientists continued some studies; for example, in 1983 and 1984 Korea Atomic Energy Research Institute was conducting chemical experiments related to the handling of spent fuel that crossed the reprocessing boundary.

Later, in an experiment at the same facility in 2000, scientists enriched 200 milligrams of uranium to near-weapons grade (up to 77 percent) using laser enrichment. The South Korean government claimed that this research was conducted without its knowledge. While uranium enriched to 77 percent is usually not considered weapons-grade, it could theoretically be used to construct a nuclear weapon. HEU with a purity of 20% or more is usable in a weapon, but this route is less desirable because far more material is required to obtain critical mass; thus, the Koreans would have needed to produce much more material to construct a nuclear weapon. This event and the earlier extraction of plutonium went unreported to the IAEA until late 2004.

IAEA response 
Following Seoul's disclosure of the above incidents, the IAEA launched a full investigation into South Korea's nuclear activities. In a report issued on November 11, 2004, the IAEA described the South Korean government's failure to report its nuclear activities a matter of "serious concern", but accepted that these experiments never produced more than very small amounts of weaponizeable fissile material. The Board of Governors decided to not make a formal finding of noncompliance, and the matter was not referred to the Security Council.

Pierre Goldschmidt, former head of the department of safeguards at the IAEA, has called on the Board of Governors to adopt generic resolutions which would apply to all states in such circumstances and has argued "political considerations played a dominant role in the board’s decision" to not make a formal finding of non-compliance.

American nuclear weapons in South Korea 

The US first deployed nuclear weapons to South Korea in 1958, and numbers peaked in the late 1960s at close to 950, including a mix of tactical and strategic weapons.

Following its accession to the Nuclear Non-Proliferation Treaty in 1985, the government of North Korea had cited the presence of US tactical nuclear weapons in South Korea as a reason to avoid completing a safeguards agreement with the International Atomic Energy Agency. In 1991, President George H W Bush announced the withdrawal of all naval and land-based tactical nuclear weapons deployed abroad, including approximately 100 such weapons based in South Korea. In January 1992, the governments of North and South Korea signed a Joint Declaration of the Denuclearization of the Korean Peninsula, and in January 1992, the North concluded a comprehensive safeguards agreement with the IAEA. Implementation meetings for the Joint Declaration took place in 1992 and 1993, but no agreement could be found, so consequently the declaration never entered into force.

In 2013, South Korean Prime Minister Chung Hong-won rejected calls to again station American tactical nuclear weapons in South Korea.

In 2017, during a period of unusually high tension, South Korean defence minister Song Young-moo  suggested it was worth reviewing the redeployment of U.S. nuclear weapons to the Korean Peninsula.

Yoon Suk-yeol, the incumbent President of South Korea, stated in 2021 that he would ask that the United States redeploy tactical nuclear weapons in South Korea.

Public opinion 
In the late 1990s, a notable minority of South Koreans supported the country's effort to reprocess materials, although only a small number called for the government to obtain nuclear weapons.

With the escalation of the 2017 North Korea crisis, amid worries that the United States might hesitate to defend South Korea from a North Korean attack for fear of inviting a missile attack against the United States, public opinion turned strongly in favour of a South Korean nuclear arsenal, with polls showing that 60% of South Koreans supported building nuclear weapons.

In 2023 Poll, found that over 76% of South Koreans support Nuclear weapons.

Nuclear-capable state

Although currently South Korea is under the US nuclear umbrella of protection, it could very well break away and try to develop its own nuclear weapons if necessary. Like Japan, South Korea has the raw materials, technology, and resources to create nuclear weapons. Previous incidents show the Republic of Korea (ROK) to be able to possess nuclear weapons in anywhere from one to three years if necessary. The ROK has been shown before to create enriched uranium up to 77%, which although not particularly powerful, shows that South Korea has the potential to make nuclear weapons with more highly enriched uranium. South Korea does not have any ICBMs but possesses a wide range of SRBM and MRBMs through the Hyunmoo series of ballistic/cruise missiles currently fielded to the ROK Army. The Hyunmoo series of ballistic missiles works similarly to the American Tomahawk Missile, which can be armed with the W80 and W84 nuclear warheads. Theoretically, if needed, the 500 kg conventional warhead could be replaced by a small nuclear warhead. The Hyunmoo missiles can already cover the entire range of North Korea and would drastically change the North's disposition if the South had nuclear armed MRBMs. Even though the ROK could procure nuclear weapons, currently like Japan it sees no reason to do so with the protection of the American nuclear arsenal. However, if a conflict erupts with the North, South Korea could quickly evolve into a nuclear-armed state and pose even with the North with the support of the US. According to Suh Kune-yull, a professor of nuclear engineering at Seoul National University, “If we decide to stand on our own feet and put our resources together, we can build nuclear weapons in six months”.

South Korean president Yoon Suk Yeol stated in January 2023 that if the security situation regarding the threat from North Korean nuclear weapons deteriorates further, South Korea would consider building their own nuclear weapons to deterent the North or request that the United States deploy nuclear weapons in South Korea. In 1991 the United States removed all of its nuclear weapons from South Korea. The statements from the South Korea president came during a policy briefing by his foreign and defense ministries; the comments are the first time South Korea has officially acknowledged they would consider developing its own nuclear arsenal in response to North Korean nuclear weapons. In 2022 South Korea announced it had developed submarine launched ballistic missiles; South Korea is the only nation with SLBMs that does not possess nuclear weapons.

In February 2023, Leader of the People Power Party Chung Jin Suk said that South Korea might need nuclear weapons.

In March 2023, Mayor of Seoul Oh Se-hoon called for South Korea to have Nuclear weapons.

Delivery systems
South Korea missile development originates in 1970 with creation of Defense Ministry's research arm the Agency of Defense Development with development starting in 1971 under orders of then president Park Chung-hee. In 19708090 was allowed to service Hawk and Nike Hercules surface-to-air missiles under agreement with maintenance facility under the supervision of the U.S which was set up in the country with South Korean engineers receiving training from the Raytheon and U.S military involving improvement of the missiles. South Korea in 1975 purchased mixer for missiles solid fuel propellant from Lockheed along with some equipment imported later on in 1978 with first successful ballistic missile test of first South Korean short range ballistic missile NHK-1(also known as White/Polar Bear) conducted the same year on September 26 demonstrating 160 km range with maximum range of 180 to 200 km. NHK-1 was by South Korea touted as completely indigenous development though in fact some of the technology was supplied and obtained from the United States. Seoul agreed to not extended range of the missile beyond 180 km under South Korea Ballistic Missile Range Guidelines with the U.S with development of its successor NHK-2 that was tested in October 1982 with development being halted in 1984 until resumption couple years later with completion in 1987 when it entered service, its guidance system was supplied by United Kingdom. In 1995 South Korea requested permission to have 300 km range missiles from the US in line with MTCR with request in 1999 for expansion to 500 km. Development of 300 km range Hyunmoo-2 started in mid to late 1990s with first test in April 1999 with entering service in 2008 as Hyunmoo-2A after restrictions were lifted from previous agreement to limitation comparable to MTCR, Hyunmoo-2B entered service in 2009 with range under MTCR-like restriction and range restriction under South Korea Ballistic Missile Range Guidelines renegotiated in 2012 with the US from 300 km to 800 km with reduced payload from 997 kg to 500 kg. Cap on missile warhead weight was lifted in 2017. On May 21, 2021, the decades-old South Korea Ballistic Missile Range Guidelines was scrapped, allowing South Korea to develop and possess any type of missile, including intercontinental ballistic missiles (ICBMs) and advanced submarine-launched ballistic missiles (SLBMs).

See also 
 International Atomic Energy Agency
 North Korea nuclear weapons program
 Nuclear power in South Korea
 Nuclear Non-Proliferation Treaty
 South Korea Ballistic Missile Range Guidelines
 Timeline of the North Korean nuclear program
 :ko:대한민국의 핵무기 개발
 :ko:대한민국의 독자 핵무장론

References

Further reading

External links
 South Korea Nuclear Chronology; Nuclear Threat Initiative

Weapons of mass destruction by country
Government of South Korea
History of South Korea
Nuclear technology in South Korea
Science and technology in South Korea
Nuclear weapons programs
Articles containing video clips